Cil-y-groeslwyd Woods, Eyarth Woods & Rocks & Craig Adwy-wynt is a Site of Special Scientific Interest in the preserved county of Clwyd, Wales.

See also
List of Sites of Special Scientific Interest in Clwyd

Sites of Special Scientific Interest in Clwyd